Anoreina is a genus of beetles in the family Cerambycidae, containing the following species:

 Anoreina ayri Martins & Galileo, 2008
 Anoreina biannulata (Bates, 1866)
 Anoreina helenae Machado & Monne, 2011
 Anoreina nana (Bates, 1861)
 Anoreina piara Martins & Galileo, 2008
 Anoreina roosevelti Machado & Monne, 2011
 Anoreina triangularis (Martins & Galileo, 2005)

References

Acanthoderini